Sarah Loken (born November 3, 1999) is a Canadian curler from White Rock, British Columbia. She currently plays lead on Team Clancy Grandy.

Career
Before joining the Sarah Daniels' Delta based rink, Loken skipped her own team of Catera Park, Kylie Karoway and Kim Bonneau. The team played in the 2016 BC junior women's championship where they made it all the way to the semifinals before losing to Team Daniels. She then joined the Daniels rink at third for the 2016–17 season. At the BC championship, the team finished second through the round robin with a 4–3 record. They then dropped the 1 vs. 2 game to Corryn Brown but were able to beat Alyssa Connell in the semifinal to qualify for the championship game. In the final, they gave up four in the fifth end, eventually losing 7–4.

The following season, the team added Kayla MacMillan to the lineup at third, shifting Loken to lead on the team. They had a successful tour season, reaching the semifinals of the Royal LePage Women's Fall Classic and the quarterfinals of the Driving Force Abbotsford Cashspiel. On the junior tour, they won the Parksville BC Junior Women's event. The team entered the BC provincial junior championship as one of the top seeds and finished first after the round robin with a 6–1 record. They then defeated Emily Bowles 11–5 in the 1 vs. 2 game to qualify for the provincial final. There, they lost 6–5 to Taylor Reese-Hansen in an extra end.

Megan Daniels aged out of juniors following the season and the team added Jessica Humphries at second. On the bonspiel circuit, they wouldn't find as much success, only reaching the playoffs once at the Challenge de Curling de Gatineau open event. They were, however, able to capture the BC junior provincial title, defeating Team Reese-Hansen 10–4 in the provincial final. This qualified them for the 2019 Canadian Junior Curling Championships where they finished 5–1 through the round robin. With a 2–2 record through the championship pool, the team was tied for third for Quebec's Laurie St-Georges, who they then beat 8–6 in the tiebreaker to qualify for the playoffs. After defeating Nova Scotia's Kaitlyn Jones 9–7 in the semifinal, they lost a tight 9–6 final to Alberta's Selena Sturmay, settling for silver. Also during the 2018–19 season, Loken was a member of the Douglas Royals rink that won a gold medal at the CCAA/Curling Canada College Curling Championships, defeating MacEwan University 7–5 in the final.

Out of juniors, Team Daniels remained intact for the 2019–20 season. On tour, the team reached the final of the King Cash Spiel but missed the playoffs in their other four events. They were able to qualify for the 2020 British Columbia Scotties Tournament of Hearts through the second open qualifier, winning 10–4 over Lindsay Hudyma. The team had a good showing at the provincial playdown, finishing 4–3 through the round robin and qualifying for the playoffs. They then beat Brette Richards 10–5 in the semifinal before losing 11–5 to Corryn Brown in the semifinal. Also this season, the Douglas Royals defended their title at the Curling Canada College Curling Championships, winning 10–1 over Humber College in the final.

After taking a season off, Loken joined Kayla MacMillan's newly formed rink of Jody Maskiewich and Lindsay Dubue for the 2021–22 season. On the tour, the team reached the final of the DeKalb Superspiel where they lost to Amber Holland. At the 2022 British Columbia Scotties Tournament of Hearts, the team qualified for the playoffs through the A Event, defeating defending champions Corryn Brown in the process. They then beat Mary-Anne Arsenault in the 1 vs. 2 game but lost to them in the provincial final 8–6, finishing in second place. They ended the season at the Best of the West event where they reached the semifinals.

For the 2022–23 season, the team added Clancy Grandy as their new skip. In their first event, they finished runner-up to Silvana Tirinzoni at the Summer Series.

Personal life
Loken is employed as a pharmacy technician at Macdonald's Prescriptions. She is in a relationship with fellow curler Cody Tanaka.

Teams

References

External links

1999 births
Canadian women curlers
Living people
Curlers from British Columbia
20th-century Canadian women
21st-century Canadian women
People from White Rock, British Columbia